Charly Boy, born Charles Chukwuemeka Oputa, 19 June 1950 (also known as CB, His Royal Punkness, and Area Fada), is a Nigerian singer & songwriter, television presenter, actor, publisher, activist and producer. One of Nigeria's most controversial entertainers, he is best known for his alternative lifestyle, political views, and media productions, most notably The Charly Boy Show. He has served as president of the Performing Musicians Association of Nigeria, and in 2011 was an Idol Series judge.

Early life
The second son of former Supreme Court Justice Chukwudifu Oputa, Oguta-native Oputa was born into a Catholic household, and is the cousin of Swedish musician Dr. Alban. As he often refused to reveal his date of birth in interviews, his age remained unknown until 2011 when he celebrated his sixtieth birthday, however, in his usual enigmatic character, he announced his 63rd birthday on 19 June 2013, making his age a contentious one. 

Although he describes his parents as liberals who encouraged their children to express themselves freely, Oputa has also spoken of their conservative nature. He aspired to become a priest, but left seminary school after a year. In his late teens he moved to America where he attended college, graduating with a degree in Communications.

Music

1982-1985: Nwata Miss
Oputa ventured into the music industry in 1982, and in 1984 independently released the highlife single Obodo GiriGiri. In 1985 was nearly denied a record deal with Polygram Nigeria due to his unconventional appearance until he was introduced to the label's managing director Ton Seysener who signed him, and Nwata Miss was released.

1988-1990:1990
Towards the late 80s Oputa, with the help of stylist and fellow singer/songwriter Tyna Onwudiwe, created a new punk persona consisting of leather jackets and boots, powerbikes, mohawks, and a new direction in music, combining African pop and Afrobeat. A pioneer in Nigeria's short-lived punk movement, he soon earned the unofficial title His Royal Punkness, and renamed his Lagos residence The Punk Palace.

Oputa's most popular album was 1990 released in 1988 – the title was a reference to Nigeria's corrupt military government which was expected to hand over power to civilians in that year, although civilian rule did not start until 1999). 1990 earned Oputa mixed reviews due to its political nature and caused national controversy, and a number of radio stations refused to play the title track. Despite this, 1990 was one of Nigeria's best-selling albums of 1988, and Oputa was credited with using his music to stand up to his government, a lá Fela Kuti. Oputa would also collaborate with Seysener to establish the annual beach concert Lekki Sunsplash.

In recent years, Oputa has worked on several collaborations with his cousin Dr. Alban, most notably on the song "Carolina" which sampled an earlier hit of Dr. Alban's – "Guess Who's Coming To Dinner" – and had originally featured singer Michael Rose. The re-worked version was sung in Nigerian Pidgin and was a hit in Nigeria. The pair also recorded the songs "Work Work Africa" and "Commercial Waste".

2021

Odudubariba is a song inspired by his role he played in King of Boys: The Return of the King

Television

The Charly Boy Show
Charly Boy's most popular television series was The Charly Boy Show – a weekly sketch/variety show with political undertones, and featured music, comedy, and celebrity appearances. Key segments included This Is Not The News (A satirical news bulletin lampooning celebrities), Mama and Papa Nothing Spoil (A bickering elderly couple who provided comical answers to viewer's questions) and Candid Camera. It launched on NTA 2 Channel 5 Lagos, and was syndicated across other stations across the country. Among the cast were Charly Boy's wife Diane Oputa, actress Stella Damasus, Mercy Oyebo, singing duo Tunde and Wunmi Obe, and actor Patrick Doyle. Charly Boy's alter-ego Madam Zigizigi (a drag character) and monologues which condemned the country's dictatorship were also popular features. 
 
Despite its popularity, The Charly Boy Show struggled with consistent sponsorship; Charly Boy would later ask celebrity friends to appeal for sponsors on-camera, without much success. The show was cancelled in 2001 after ten years. In 2022, Charly Boy announced the show's return.

The Charly Boy Kiddies Show
The Charly Boy Kiddies Show was a short-lived spin-off of the original series aimed at children. Although the show's creator made regular appearances, the main cast consisted of children, and included segments from the original show including Candid Camera, albeit performed by child actors.

Like its predecessor, The Charly Boy Kiddies Show failed to gain sponsors, and was subsequently cancelled. However, in 2010, Charly Boy established The Charly Boy Kiddies Affair in Abuja, which aimed to boost the potential of Nigerian children.

Zoom Time
Zoom Time was a The Charly Boy Show politics spin-off co-presented by Charly Boy and Tunde Obe (the latter was also a cast member of The Charly Boy Show) which featured prominent politicians and military men. Among those interviewed were former Nigerian president Ibrahim Babangida; this interview was among the most memorable in the history of the show. Occasionally entertainers were interviewed. The show was also famous for its gag which saw politicians pretend to ride an imaginary motorbike while imitating the sound of its exhaust pipe ("Zoom, zoom, zoom!").

Nigerian Idol
In 2011, Charly Boy replaced Audu Maikori as a judge on Nigerian Idol. Although his stint was a ratings success, viewers disapproved of his antics which included bringing his pet python to the judging table during the audition and a human skull to the live shows. As of 2013, Charly Boy is no longer involved with Nigerian Idol.

Advocacy
Charly Boy is known as an advocate of the masses as he has fought for the rights of the average Nigerian. He has on several occasions been tortured by the Nigerian police and the military for standing up to his country's government. However he is also, on occasion, regarded as their friend, depending on the sensibility of those in power. An inspirational writer, Charly Boy focuses on various subjects in several newspapers including The Daily Post and his own publication Charly Boy Magazine, and has been known to write slogans on rocks in Abuja where he currently resides. An avid supporter of Okada riders in Nigeria - an organisation that has been frowned on by government as they have been regarded as a menace and unsafe transportation - he has fought for the rights of Okada users - most of whom are poor individuals who earn their living by using the Okada for commercial purposes; he also stated that operators play a prominent role in government as most politicians engage their services during campaigns. His efforts earned him the name Area Fada.

In the mid-nineties Charly Boy fought for the rights of military pensioners during the Abacha-led military dispensation by  marching to Defence headquarters in Abuja to demand payment of their pension arrears. He has also fronted campaigns for Nigerian Widows, and was founder of the Save Nigeria from Nigeria campaign during the last presidential election . During the Fuel Subsidy protest in 2012, he was arrested alongside six other activists for civil disobedience.

He was one of the celebrities who organised fundraisers to support his old friend Tyna Onwudiwe who would later die of lung cancer.

In 2017, Charly Boy started Our Mumu Don Do movement, and participated in a daily sit out protest alongside Deji Adeyanju calling on President Muhammadu Buhari to resume office or resign after the President had spent over 60 days outside the country on a health visit to the UK.

Acting
In 1996, Oputa starred in the Nollywood movie Backstab in which he played a gangster. In 2021 he appeared in King of Boys and Money Miss Road the following year.

Other ventures
Charly Boy is the founder of New Waves Productions and publisher of The Charly Boy Magazine which he launched in 2010 and wrote for regularly. In 1991, he wrote the column Nuts and Screws for defunct women's publication Poise. As a music video producer/director, Charly Boy has worked with numerous music artists including Onyeka Onwenu ("Dancing in the Sun"), Alex O ("She's So Pretty"), Floxy Bee ("Eko"), and Femi Kuti ("No Cause For Alarm?").

In 1990, Charly Boy was among the Nigerian singers who supported Yvonne Chaka Chaka – then the face of Pepsi in Africa – in a series of concerts and featured in a commercial for the brand with Femi Kuti and Evi-Edna Ogosi. He was also in a number of Target cigarettes print commercials with his wife Diane.

Image
Charly Boy is well known for his change of image which started with androgyny at the start of his music career. His preference for make-up, relaxed and braided hairstyles, and "women's clothing" caused controversy among conservative Nigerians. He would later be nicknamed "Nigeria's Boy George" by entertainment journalists, but claimed that he had started this persona long before his British counterpart became famous.

In the late nineties, Charly Boy began to wear his hair in dreadlocks and adopted a goth image, acquiring piercings and tattoos which were frowned on by society who viewed his modification as Satanic and occultist. In 2012, he introduced his fans to Linda, his female alter ego. Charly Boy continues to sport the goth look, and in 2014 he shaved off his dreadlocks due to a thinning hairline.

Controversy
In 1988, the album "1990" included the song "Big Bottom", a tribute to the female derriere. In most Nigerian states it was denied airplay on radio due to its somewhat raunchy lyrics. The accompanying video, deemed ahead of its time, features Charly Boy's wife Diane as a woman with a generous posterior who is a guest at Charly Boy's wedding; as she bends over during the ceremony, the groom turns around to stare at her rear, to the annoyance of his bride. Other features of the video include members of the public unaware that their buttocks are on camera. The "Big Bottom" video was subsequently banned by the Nigeria Broadcasting Commission on grounds of obscenity .

The Charly Boy Show was widely criticised for being overtly sexual – Charly Boy's dancers (known as "Charly's Angels") were often shown clothed in S&M outfits and brandishing whips. His political views on the show also came under fire – he would slate Nigeria's military rulers who were accused of corrupting the system.

In 2010, Charly Boy was interviewed by the magazine E 24-7 alongside equally maverick Channel O presenter Denrele. The article, captioned "Caught In The Act - Yes, I Love Denrele" featured photographs of the pair in suggestive poses including a mouth-to-mouth kiss. As homosexuality is illegal in Nigeria, the pictures sparked rumours that they were a gay couple, a claim they continue to deny, stating that the pictures were for publicity.

In 2012, Charly Boy threatened to take legal action against two national newspapers (The Saturday Mirror and the Daily Independent) after it was reported that he was gay and a member of The Illuminati; he allegedly disclosed this in an interview with entertainment writer Ed Jatto. Later, in another interview with the Nigerian Vanguard, he stated "'I’m not concerned about name calling, but the way and manner in which we apply professionalism in whatever we are doing. If I'm gay, I will fight for the right of homosexuals. I am not gay and I am not part of any organisation called [The Illuminati] in any way, shape or form. I have never had problems with whatever the press writes about me. But these publications have gone beyond the boundaries."

Personal life
Contrary to popular belief, Charly Boy is not gay. He has been married to African-American singer and former fashion designer Diane for over thirty years.
The couple have children together, and Charly Boy – who has been married before – has children from past relationships.

References

1951 births
Living people
20th-century Nigerian male singers
Igbo-language singers
Igbo rhythm and blues musicians
Musicians from Imo State
Nigerian pop singers
Nigerian media personalities
Nigerian Roman Catholics
Nigerian singer-songwriters
Nigerian television journalists
Nigerian television personalities
Nigerian television presenters
Nigerian television producers
Nigerian publishers (people)